Red Octopus is the second album by American rock band Jefferson Starship, released on Grunt Records in 1975. Certified double platinum by RIAA in 1995, it is the best-selling album by any incarnation of Jefferson Airplane and its spin-off groups. The single "Miracles" was the highest-charting single any permutation of the band had until Starship's "We Built This City" a decade later, ultimately peaking at No. 3 on the Billboard singles chart; the album itself reached No. 1 for four non-consecutive weeks on the Billboard 200. As with several other albums from the epoch, stereo and quadraphonic mixes of Red Octopus were released concurrently.

Following a guest appearance on the preceding Dragon Fly, Jefferson Airplane founder Marty Balin returned as a fully integrated member of the ensemble. Balin wrote or co-wrote five of the ten tracks on the album, including "Miracles." The group attempted to create a commercialized sound which was a total contrast to their past works, paving the musical direction of their next two albums.

Track listing

Charts

Personnel
Marty Balin – lead (2, 5, 7, 10) and backing vocals
Grace Slick – lead (1, 4, 6) and backing vocals, piano (4)
Paul Kantner – lead (8) and backing vocals, rhythm guitar
Craig Chaquico – lead guitar, backing vocals
Papa John Creach – electric violin
David Freiberg – bass (3, 6, 9), organ (2, 8), ARP synthesizer (4, 10), keyboards (7),  backing vocals
Pete Sears – bass (1, 2, 4, 5, 7, 8, 10), keyboards (3, 5) electric (2, 11) and acoustic (6, 8–10) pianos, organ (6, 8, 9), clavinet (6), ARP synthesizer (9), backing vocals
John Barbata – drums, percussion, backing vocals

Additional personnel
Bobbye Hall – percussion, congas
Irv Cox – saxophone

Production
Jefferson Starship – producer
Larry Cox – producer, engineer
Pat Ieraci (Maurice) – production coordinator
Steve Mantoani, Jeffrey Husband – recordists
Paul Dowell – amp consultant
Dave Roberts – string and horn arrangement
Recorded and Mixed at Wally Heiders, San Francisco
Mastered by Kent Duncan, Kendun Recorders, Burbank
Live tracks recorded at Winterland, November 7, 1975
Bill Thompson – manager
Frank Mulvey – art director
Jim Marshall – liner photograph
Gribbitt! – graphics

Chart positions

Singles
"Miracles" (August 23, 1975) #3 US (Billboard Hot 100)
"Play On Love" (December 13, 1975) #49 US Billboard Hot 100, #47 US Cash Box Top 100

References

External links

1975 albums
Albums recorded at Wally Heider Studios
Grunt Records albums
Jefferson Starship albums
RCA Records albums